Limnonectes doriae (common name: Burmese wart frog, Doria's frog, or red stream frog) is a species of frog in the family Dicroglossidae found in the Southeast Asia.

Etymology
The specific name doriae commemorates the Italian naturalist Giacomo Doria.

Distribution and habitat
These frogs can be found in Myanmar and western and peninsular Thailand and Peninsular Malaysia, as well as in the Andaman Islands (India).  They are terrestrial frogs found in primary tropical forest. Breeding takes place in forest streams where the tadpoles develop. Its conservation status is insufficiently known.

References

doriae
Frogs of India
Fauna of the Andaman and Nicobar Islands
Amphibians of Malaysia
Amphibians of Myanmar
Amphibians of Thailand
Amphibians described in 1887
Taxa named by George Albert Boulenger
Taxonomy articles created by Polbot